Frank Baltrusch (born 21 March 1964) is a former backstroke swimmer from East Germany who won the silver medal in the 200 m backstroke at the 1988 Summer Olympics in Seoul, South Korea, in a time of 1:59.60.

He finished 6th in the final of the 100m backstroke in a time of 56.10 seconds.

References
 databaseOlympics

1964 births
Living people
Olympic swimmers of East Germany
Male backstroke swimmers
Swimmers at the 1988 Summer Olympics
Olympic silver medalists for East Germany
Sportspeople from Magdeburg
Place of birth missing (living people)
World Aquatics Championships medalists in swimming
European Aquatics Championships medalists in swimming
Medalists at the 1988 Summer Olympics
Olympic silver medalists in swimming